Mohammed Al-Majhad (born 16 July 1998) is a Saudi Arabian footballer who plays as a midfielder for Saudi Pro League side Al-Ahli and the Saudi Arabia national team.

Career statistics

Club

International
Statistics accurate as of match played 10 August 2019.

References

External links
 

1998 births
Living people
Saudi Arabian footballers
Association football midfielders
Saudi Professional League players
Saudi First Division League players
Al-Fateh SC players
Al-Ahli Saudi FC players
Saudi Arabia youth international footballers
Saudi Arabia international footballers
People from Al-Hasa
Saudi Arabian Shia Muslims